Fung Tak Estate is a mixed TPS and public housing estate in Diamond Hill, Kowloon, Hong Kong, near Lung Poon Court, Plaza Hollywood, Galaxia and MTR Diamond Hill station. It has seven residential blocks built in 1991 and is named from nearby Fung Tak Road. Some of the flats were sold to tenants through Tenants Purchase Scheme Phase 1 in 1998.

Fung Chuen Court and Fung Lai Court are Home Ownership Scheme housing courts in Diamond Hill near Fung Tak Estate, built in 1991 and 1997 respectively.

Houses

Fung Tak Estate

Fung Chuen Court

Fung Lai Court

Demographics
According to the 2016 by-census, Fung Tak Estate had a population of 13,342. The median age was 49.2 and the majority of residents (98.1 per cent) were of Chinese ethnicity. The average household size was 2.6 people. The median monthly household income of all households (i.e. including both economically active and inactive households) was HK$24,990.

Politics
For the 2019 District Council election, the estate fell within two constituencies. Fung Tak Estate and Fung Lai Court falls within the Fung Tak constituency, which was formerly represented by Cheung Ka-yi until July 2021, while Fung Chuen Court falls within the Lung Sing constituency, which is currently represented by Mandy Tam Heung-man.

Education
Fung Tak Estate is in Primary One Admission (POA) School Net 45. Within the school net are multiple aided schools (operated independently but funded with government money); no government primary schools are in this net.

See also

Public housing estates in Diamond Hill

References

Residential buildings completed in 1991
Diamond Hill
Wong Tai Sin District
Public housing estates in Hong Kong
Tenants Purchase Scheme
1991 establishments in Hong Kong
Tai Hom